This is a list of schools in Bohol, Philippines.

 Alburquerque:
 Alburquerque Central Elementary School
 San Roque National High School, Alburquerque, Bohol

 Alicia:
 Alicia National High School
 Blessed Elena Kindergarten School
 Blessed Trinity Elem. School
 La Hacienda National High School

 Anda:
 Anda High School
 Badiang National High School
 Candabong National High School
 Holy Infant Academy

 Antequera:
 Bantolinao National High School
 Canlaas High School
 Christ the King Academy

 Baclayon:
 Baclayon High School
 Immaculata High School

 Balilihan:
 Carmel Academy
 Cong. Pablo Malazarte Mem. High School
 Hanopol National High School

 Batuan:
 Anthony Academy
 Batuan National High School

 Bien Unido:
 Bien Unido Academy Inc.
 Hingotangan National High School
 Holy Child Academy of Bien Unido, Bohol Inc.
 Pres. Carlos P. Garcia Tech Voc School of Fisheries and Arts
 Montessori Educational Learning Centre of Ubay, Bien Unido Branch

 Bilar:
 Bilar National High School
 CVSCAFT, Main Campus

 Buenavista:
 Cabulan National High School
 Cangawa National High School
 Lubang National High School

 Calape:
 Bohol Province Institute
 Fermin Tayabas High School
 Mayor A. R. Tuazon National School of Fisheries
 Pangangan National High School Annex
 Pangangan National High School Main

 Candijay:
 Anoling High School
 Candijay High School
 Central Visayas State College of Agriculture, Fisheries and Technology (CVSCAFT)
 Cogtong High School
 La Union National High School
 St. Joseph Academy
 Tambongan National High School

 Carmen:
 Ambassador Pablo R. Suarez, Jr. National High School
 Francisco Adlaon High School
 Isabel Gujol Memorial High School
 Katipunan National High School
 Policronio S. Dano, Sr. High School
 St. Anthony Academy

 Catigbian:
 Catigbian Elementary School Annex
 Catigbian National High School
 Holy Infant Academy
 Immaculate Mary Academy (IMA)
 Mantacida High School

 Clarin:
 Clarin School of Fisheries
 Nahawan National High School

 Corella:
 Corella National High School

 Cortes:
 Infant King Academy
 Fatima National High School

 Dagohoy:
 Dagohoy National High School

 Danao:
 Cantubod High School
 Danao National High School
 Francisco Dagohoy Memorial High School
 Taming High School

 Dauis:
 Biking National High School
 Dauis High School
 Tabalong National High School

 Dimiao:
 Canhayupon National High School
 Dimiao National High School
 St. Nicholas Academy

 Duero:
 Duero National High School
 Guinsularan National High School
 Immaculate Academy

 Garcia Hernandez:
 Garcia Hernandez High School
 St. John the Baptist Academy
 Tabuan National High School
 Catungawan National High School
 Guinacot National High School

 Getafe:
 Campao Oriental National High School
 Handumon High School
 Sto. Niño Institute
 Tulang National High School
 Getafe High School

 Guindulman:
 Mayuga National High School
 St. Mary Academy
 Guinacot National High School
 Catungawan National High School

 Inabanga:
 Inabanga High School Nabuad
 San Jose National High School, Inabanga
 Southern Inabanga High School
 St. Paul's Academy

 Jagna:
 Bohol Institute of Technology
 Calabacita National High School
 Central Visayan Institute
 Colegio de la Medalla Milagrosa
 Faraon National High School
 Lonoy National High School
 San Miguel Academy

 Lila:
 Holy Rosary Academy
 Lila National High School

 Loay:
 Hinawanan High School
 Holy Trinity Academy

 Loboc:
 Camayaan National High School
 Loboc Academy PMI
 Loboc National High School
 Oy High School

 Loon:
 Cabilao National High School
 Gov. Jacinto Borja High School
 Cantaongan National High School
 Loon South High School
 Sacred Heart Academy
 Sandigan High School
 St. Teresa Academy
 University of Bohol Loon Institute

 Mabini:
 Concepcion National High School
 San Roque National High School, Mabini, Bohol
 Sta. Monica Institute

 Maribojoc:
 Busao National High School
 Immaculate Mother School Foundation
 Pagnitoan National High School
 St. Vincent Institute

 Panglao:
 Lourdes National High School
 San Agustin Academy

 Pilar:
 Pilar National High School
 San Isidro National High School, Pilar
 Virgen del Pilar Academy

 Pres. Carlos P. Garcia or Pitogo:
 Aguining National High School
 Holy Child Academy
 Villa Milagrosa High School

 Sagbayan:
 Canmano High School
 Japer Memorial School
 San Agustin National High School
 St. Augustine Institute

 San Isidro:
 San Isidro National High School, San Isidro
 Bugang High School

 San Miguel:
 Mahayag National High School
 Mahayag Elementary School
 San Miguel National High School
 Bugang National High School
 Tomoc High School

 Sierra Bullones:
 Dusita High School
 Dusita SDA Multigrade School
 Sierra Bullones Technical Vocational National High School
 Bugsoc High School
 Nan-od High School
 Cahayag Elementary School
 Anibongan Elementary School
 Dusita Elementary School
 Matin-ao Elementary School
 Danicop Elementary School
 Casilay Elementary School
 Magsaysay Elementary School
 Lataban Elementary School
 Abachanan Elementary School
 Bugsoc Elementary School
 Sierra Bullones Central Elementary School
 Villa Garcia Elementary School
 San Agustin Elementary School

 Sikatuna:
 Sikatuna National High School

 Tagbilaran:
 BIT International College, formerly the Bohol Institute of Technology or BIT
 Bohol Deaf Academy
 Bohol Island State University Main Campus formerly Central Visayas State College of Agriculture, Forestry and Technology (CVSCAFT) Tagbilaran City Campus
 Bohol Wisdom School (BWS)
 Cogon Elementary and High School
 D M L Montessori School
 Dr. Cecilio Putong National High School, formerly the Bohol National High School (BNHS)
 Holy Infant School - Tagbilaran
 Holy Name University, formerly (Divine Word College of Tagbilaran) High School Department
 Grace Christian School
 Holy Name University (HNU), formerly the Divine Word College of Tagbilaran (DWC-T)
 Holy Spirit School or HSS
 Holy Trinity Foundation School
 Immaculate Heart of Mary Seminary (IHMS)
 Manga National High School
 Mansasa High School
 Merne Graham Montessori School
 PMI Colleges Bohol - Tagbilaran City
 Royal Christian School
 St. Therese Elementary School - Dampas
 St. Therese Kindergarten School
 Tagbilaran City Science High School
 University of Bohol (UB)
 Victoriano D. Tirol Advanced Learning Center

 Talibon:
 Bagacay High School
 Blessed Trinity College
 Blessed Trinity High School
 Bohol Institute of Technology
 Bohol Maranatha Christian School Maranatha Christian School
 Calituban High School
 Pres. Carlos P Garcia Memorial High School, Talibon
 San Jose National High School, Talibon
 Sikatuna High School, Talibon

 Trinidad:
 Hinlayagan National High School
 Kauswagan National High School Hinlayagan Annex
 Kinanoan High School
 St. Isidore Academy
 Tagum Sur National High School

 Tubigon:
 Cahayag National High School
 Cawayanan High School
 Holy Cross Academy
 Holy Family of Nazareth Elementary School
 Salus Institute of Technology

 Ubay:
 Biabas Trade High School
 Benliw Apostolic Christian School 
 Bohol Northeastern Colleges
 Bulilis National High School
 Cagting High School
 Camambugan National High School
 Don Aguedo Reyes Maboloc Memorial National High School
 Erico Aumentado High School
 Grace Comprehensive Learning Academy
 Hambabauran High School
 Holy Child Academy
 ICTHUS Christian Academy
 Montessori Educational Learning Center of Ubay
 Sacred Heart Learning and Formation Center
 San Pascual Academy
 San Pascual National Agricultural High School
 Tapal Integrated School
 Tubog Integrated School	
 Ubay Baptist Christian Academy 
 Ubay Seventh-day Adventist Multigrade School
 Ubay National Science High School
 Ubay Community College
 Union National High School

 Valencia:
 Valencia Technical Vocational High School
 Mayor Pablo O. Lim Memorial High School

Note 
This is copied from the Cebuano Wikipedia.

 

ceb:Listahan sa mga eskwelahan sa Bohol